Exorphins are exogenous opioid peptides, distinguished from endorphins, or endogenous opioid peptides.

Exorphins include opioid food peptides like gluten exorphin and microbial opioid peptides and any other opioid peptide foreign to a host that have metabolic efficacy for that host. Exorphins can be converted from plants and animals but also dairy products and certain vegetables like spinach and soy.

Exorphins can be released for many different kinds of proteins and thus can be isolated from various sources such as from plant proteins or from enzymes of the digestive system of animals. The study of exorphins as a bioactive peptide can be a source of discovery for new kinds of food and drugs to treat and prevent diseases associated with the accumulation of exorphins.

Connection and treatment of autism 
Effective therapies to manage autism remain scarce. According to the exorphin theory of autism, an increase in the levels of exorphin is linked to symptoms of autism. Based on this concept, experiments have attempted to reduce the symptoms of autism by using large amounts of protease to break down exorphins before they are absorbed. Experiments have also attempted to enhance and utilize enzymes existing in the gut to break down exorphins in a similar fashion, since the production of exorphins within the gut is inevitable.

Connection with schizophrenia 
Exorphins can cause various symptoms of schizophrenia if mutation occurs at a few selected loci. Genetic mutation at one of these loci can lead to increased absorption of exorphins via receptor mediated endocytosis. Another possibility from these particular loci is that catabolization of exorphins can be disrupted thus allowing the exorphin to persist in the body. This would lead to exorphins entering the brain capillary, bypassing the blood brain barrier, and inflicting negative repercussion on the brain. This does not mean that exorphin will necessarily cause schizophrenia, as susceptibility to the disease is dependent on an individual's genetic makeup. However, by increasing the probability that exorphins enter the brain, it will also increase the chance of an individual displaying schizophrenic symptoms.

References 

Opioid peptides